Estelle is a hamlet in the Cévennes region of France in the peripheral zone of a national park. It has a population of around twenty permanent residents and twenty holiday homes. Estelle (Estela) is occitan for "star". The village belongs to the commune of Arrigas. The closest sizeable town is Le Vigan, capital town of Cévennes.

Villages in Occitania (administrative region)